The 2023 Oklahoma State Cowboys baseball team will represent Oklahoma State University during the 2023 NCAA Division I baseball season. The Cowboys play their home games at O'Brate Stadium as a member of the Big 12 Conference. They are led by head coach Josh Holliday, in his eleventh season at Oklahoma State.

Previous season 

The 2022 team finished the season with a 42–22 record and a 15–9 record in the Big 12. In the 2022 Big 12 Conference baseball tournament, the fourth-seeded Cowboys made a run to the semifinals where they fell to fifth-seeded Texas in Game 7, 2–9. They earned an at-large bid into the 2022 NCAA Division I baseball tournament, where they were seeded seventh overall and the top seed in the Stillwater Regional. There, the Cowboys were eliminated by second-seeded Arkansas.

Preseason

Award watch lists
Listed in the order that they were released

Big 12 media poll

Source:

Preseason Big 12 awards and honors

Preseason All-Americans

Sources:

Schedule and results

Statistics

Team batting

Team pitching

Rankings

Notes

References

External links 
 OK State Baseball

Oklahoma State Cowboys
Oklahoma State Cowboys baseball seasons
Oklahoma State Cowboys baseball